Andrew Holder is an Australian cricketer. He made his first-class debut for Western Australia on 13 November 2017 in the 2017-18 Sheffield Shield season.

References

1999 births
Living people
Australian cricketers
Western Australia cricketers